The No Music of AIFFs is a remix album by American hip hop duo Themselves. It includes remixes of songs from the duo's second studio album The No Music. It was released on Anticon in 2003. It peaked at number 86 on the CMJ Radio 200 chart, as well as number 11 on CMJ's Hip-Hop chart.

Critical reception
Tim Stelloh of PopMatters gave the album a favorable review, saying: "The originals, which might have plenty of great qualities, never sound quite the same." He commented that Themselves' vocalist Doseone is "essentially breaking all the genre rules and gnawing his form to shreds."

Track listing

References

External links
 

2003 remix albums
Themselves albums
Anticon albums